There have been three German cruisers named Nürnberg :

 
 
  - launched in 1934

See also

  - 351-foot steamship that was also rigged for sail, built in 1874 

German Navy ship names